The following is a list of films produced in Italy during 1950 (see 1950 in film):

A-B

C-K

L-P

Q-Z

Documentaries

References

External links
Italian films of 1950 at the Internet Movie Database

Lists of 1950 films by country or language
1950
Films